Mantaritza Biosphere Reserve is situated to the north of Golyama Syutka Peak in the Rhodope Mountains in Bulgaria, and covers an area of 1319,9 hectares. The reserve was established in 1968 to protect the old coniferous forests and the biotopes of the Western capercaillie (Tetrao urogalus). The area was declared as biosphere reserve in 1977.  It represents century-old forests of pure and mixed stands of Norway spruce (Picea abies), European birch (Fagus sylvatica) and European silver fir (Abies alba). The reserve is situated in the Bulgarian Floristic sub-region of West Rhodope within the Central European mountain biotic province. The varied fauna includes brown bear (Ursus arctos) , red deer (Cervus elaphus),  roe deer (Capreolus capreolus), wild boar (Sus scrofa), pine marten (Martes martes),  European badger (Meles meles), hazel grouse (Bonasa bonasia), black woodpecker (Dryocopus martius) and crested tit (Parus cristatus).

This area has been little affected by man. Before the biosphere reserve was designated in 1977, small-scale selective cutting took place and water reservoirs were constructed. This biosphere reserve is currently under revision.

Sources

References 

Biosphere reserves of Bulgaria
Nature reserves in Bulgaria
Geography of Pazardzhik Province
Tourist attractions in Pazardzhik Province
Protected areas established in 1968
1968 establishments in Bulgaria